
Gmina Kołaczkowo is a rural gmina (administrative district) in Września County, Greater Poland Voivodeship, in west-central Poland.

Villages
Gmina Kołaczkowo contains the villages and settlements of Bieganowo, Borzykowo, Budziłowo, Cieśle Małe, Cieśle Wielkie, Gałęzewice, Gorazdowo, Grabowo Królewskie, Kołaczkowo, Krzywa Góra, Łagiewki, Sokolniki, Spławie, Szamarzewo, Wszembórz, Zieliniec and Żydowo

Neighbouring gminas
Gmina Kołaczkowo is bordered by the gminas of Lądek, Miłosław, Pyzdry, Strzałkowo, Września and Żerków.

References

Polish official population figures 2006

 
Kolaczkowo